Jean-Louis Margue (born 9 August 1952) is a retired Luxembourgian football defender.

References

1952 births
Living people
Luxembourgian footballers
FC Progrès Niederkorn players
Association football defenders
Luxembourg international footballers